Euseius tutsi is a species of mite in the family Phytoseiidae.

References

tutsi
Articles created by Qbugbot
Animals described in 1962